"Let It Rain" is a song by English pop boy band East 17, released on 13 March 1995 as the fourth single from their second album, Steam (1994). It reached number one in Lithuania and Israel, and the top 10 in Finland, Ireland and the UK. Additionally, it was a top 20 hit in Australia, Ireland, the Netherlands, and Norway.

Critical reception
Caroline Sullivan from The Guardian declared the song as an "unpretentious dancefloor sparkler". In his weekly UK chart commentary, James Masterton wrote that "Let It Rain" "turns back to the harder dance sound that typifies much of their output and sounds in places like a distant relation of their first hit "House of Love" back in September 1992." A reviewer from Music Week gave it four out of five, calling it "a more upbeat, but equally commercial, follow-up to the band's Christmas number one is in remixed form, ensuring interest from even Steam-owning fans." The reviewer added, "It will no doubt be boosted by the lads' Brits performance last week." Alan Jones deemed it "preposterous". James Hamilton from the RM Dance Update described it as a "'love rain down on me' chorused rap [track]".

Music video
A music video was produced to promote the single. It was later published on YouTube in September 2017, and had generated more than 3.2 million views as of January 2023.

Track listings
 CD and 7-inch single
 "Let It Rain" (Thunder radio edit) – 3:32
 "Let It Rain" (J-Pac Sleeting edit) – 3:33

 CD maxi
 "Let It Rain" (Thunder radio edit) – 3:32
 "Let It Rain" (Overworld Storm edit) – 3:46
 "Let It Rain" (J-Pac sleeting remix) – 5:35
 "Let It Rain" (Overworld Storm mix) – 6:40

 12-inch maxi
 "Let It Rain" (City of Love club mix) – 6:33
 "Let It Rain" (City of Love instrumental mix) – 6:33
 "Let It Rain" (City of Love radio edit) – 3:34
 "Let It Rain" (Fritz 12-inch mix) – 4:39
 "Let It Rain" (Fritz edit) – 3:51

Credits
 Written by Harding/Curnow, Kean and Mortimer
 Engineered by Dillon Gallagher and Phil Harding
 Mixed and produced by Phil Harding and Ian Curnow and Rob Kean
 Artwork by Form
 Photography by Lawrence Watson

Charts

References

1994 songs
1995 singles
East 17 songs
Songs written by Tony Mortimer
Songs written by Phil Harding (producer)
Song recordings produced by Phil Harding (producer)
Songs written by Ian Curnow
Number-one singles in Israel